Hi-de-Hi! is
a BBC television sitcom shown on BBC1 from 1 January 1980 to 30 January 1988.

Set in 1959 and 1960 in Maplins, a fictional holiday camp, the show was written by Jimmy Perry and David Croft, who also wrote Dad's Army and It Ain't Half Hot Mum amongst other programmes. The title was the greeting the campers heard and in early episodes was written Hi de Hi. The series revolved around the lives of the camp's entertainers, most of whom were struggling actors and has-beens.

Inspiration for the series were the experiences of Jimmy Perry, one of the programme's writers. After being demobilised from the Army, he was a Redcoat at Butlins in Filey and Pwllheli during the holiday season.

The series gained large audiences and won a BAFTA as Best Comedy Series in 1984. In a 2008 poll on Channel 4, Hi-de-Hi! was voted the 35th most popular comedy catchphrase. In 2014, Jimmy Perry confirmed that Hi-de-Hi! would be repeated, and it began a rerun on 2 February 2015 on BBC Two as part of Afternoon Classics, alongside 'Allo 'Allo!, To the Manor Born and Open All Hours. Hi-De-Hi currently repeats on Gold.

Synopsis

Hi-de-Hi! is set at a holiday camp in the fictional seaside town of Crimpton-on-Sea, Essex.

Loosely based on Butlin's (redcoats), or Pontins, (bluecoats), or Warners (green coats), where the show was filmed (see below), Maplins is part of a fictional holiday camp group owned by Joe Maplin, with "yellowcoats". Cambridge University Professor of Archaeology Jeffrey Fairbrother, who had become tired of academia, has been appointed the new entertainment manager. He is clearly unqualified for the position. This has annoyed the camp host, Ted Bovis, who had expected the post.

The job of camp comic is given to the naive but kind-hearted Spike Dixon, who wants an introduction to the world of show business. Many episodes involve Ted Bovis attempting to scam the campers as well as the well-meaning Fairbrother, who also has to avoid the romantic approaches of the chief yellowcoat and sports organiser, Gladys Pugh.

The other main characters in the show were mainly out-of-work actors, actresses and entertainers at the tail end of their careers. Fred Quilley was a disqualified jockey, Yvonne and Barry Stuart-Hargreaves were former ballroom champions, Mr Partridge was a music hall star reduced to performing Punch and Judy puppet shows, despite hating children, and Peggy Ollerenshaw, an eccentric but ambitious chalet maid who dreams of becoming a yellowcoat.

Characters
Professor Jeffrey Fairbrother (Simon Cadell) (Series 1–5) Entertainment Manager – After becoming a Professor at Cambridge University, he resigned from Cambridge and joined Maplins holiday camp as Entertainment Manager, hoping it would give him an insight into the lives of everyday people. He failed to connect with campers and the entertainment staff, and was exceedingly embarrassed about introducing the kind of lavatorial humour favoured by Ted Bovis and the campers. He had to deal with issues outside his job description, such as Gladys' smouldering passion for him and being asked to carry out dishonest acts to further Joe Maplin's business.
Ted Bovis (Paul Shane) Camp Host – Ted was the camp host and was well liked by the campers. He was always running scams to cheat the campers out of money: these included fake birthdays, raffles, fund-raisers and rigged bingo. He often tried to better himself by performing as a comedian at upper-class functions, most of which were unsuccessful.
Gladys Pugh (Ruth Madoc) Chief/Sports Organiser/Radio Maplin Announcer – Gladys disliked all the other female Yellowcoats, in particular Sylvia Garnsey, whom she saw as competition in her fight for Jeffrey's affections. Like Jeffrey, she also disapproved of Ted's schemes to scam the campers. Gladys was left heartbroken when Jeffrey departed for Wisconsin without telling anyone, but she quickly recovered upon meeting Squadron Leader Clive Dempster, who arrived to take over Fairbrother's job.
Spike Dixon (Jeffrey Holland) Camp Comic – Spike was born on 12 September (year unknown) and brought up in Edgbaston with his childhood sweetheart Brenda, the daughter of the local butcher. After leaving school he gained a good position in the Income Tax office, but resigned in 1959 and joined the entertainment staff at Maplins. It is not known how long he had known Ted, but they were already well-acquainted by the time they travelled on the train to the camp and it was suggested that it was Ted who got Spike the job. Spike shared a chalet with Ted, and there were many humorous scenes between the pair in their chalet, such as Spike being kept awake by Ted's snoring. Spike often tried to branch out into his own style of comedy, designing and making his own costumes and funny sequences. These received mixed reactions from the campers, but Ted criticised almost all of them. Spike was a very honest and law-abiding man, and was the only member of the entertainment staff who didn't run his own scheme to scam the campers for money. Although he was loyal to Ted and willing to turn a blind-eye to his schemes, he was often shocked at the lengths Ted would go to in order to make money. Spike had to make an impossible choice between his job and the woman he loved during the 1959 season, when his girlfriend, Brenda, said she would marry him only if he gave up his job and went to work for her father's business. He chose his job and ended their relationship. During the 1960 season he became involved with April, one of the new Yellowcoats. At the same time, Spike also fell in love with Gladys, but this never amounted to anything. He continued his relationship with April, and she wanted him to leave Maplins and go back to the tax office so they could get married and have a steady income. As with Brenda, he again decided against this in favour of show business. Spike's immediate intentions after the 1960 season were left unknown, though he revealed he was going to join Ted over Christmas playing a Chinese policeman in a pantomime. It was also implied that he had resumed his affair with April.
Peggy Ollerenshaw (Su Pollard) Chalet Maid/Yellowcoat – Peggy was the maid who looked after the staff chalet lines under the supervision of the fearsome Miss Cathcart. She always aspired to be a Yellowcoat, and tried her hardest to get involved with the entertainment in any way she could. Born in Lancashire in 1931, her father worked for the coal and gaslight company and had a passion for motorbike racing, and Peggy was an experienced rider who had a licence by the time she was 16. Her father had died by the time she joined Maplins, and Peggy was supporting her widowed mother from her wages. In addition to her regular duties, she often helped out the entertainment staff, and could always be seen in the evenings in the Hawaiian ballroom, enjoying (and often joining in with) the evening entertainments. She frequently tried to get involved in the entertainment events, but was always stopped by Gladys, who forbade Peggy's involvement as she was not on the entertainment staff. However, on several occasions, Gladys was overruled by Jeffrey Fairbrother, who allowed Peggy to take part in certain events, which usually involved dressing up in silly costumes to take the place of certain members of the entertainment staff (usually Yvonne) who found it humiliating. Peggy used to play the organ in chapel, and stepped in when Ramona didn't turn up to play at the Marines event. Peggy had a rather vivid imagination and was often easily taken in by others' lies, particularly Ted's ridiculous tales when he needed a cover story. Peggy finally became a Yellowcoat in the final episode, when Dawn was hospitalised and they needed a replacement for the final two weeks of the season. After spending just one day as a Yellowcoat, she collapsed from nervous exhaustion and was admitted to hospital but she was well liked by the guests and she looked forward to returning the next season. Unfortunately her job as a Yellowcoat was short-lived, due to Maplins abolishing Yellowcoats after the 1960 season. She stayed on at the camp temporarily after the season ended, but in her old position as a chalet maid, claiming it was still a job and better than being out of work. It was left unknown whether Peggy continued working at Maplins after the 1960 season or whether she moved on. Peggy became something of a breakout character for the show, being added to the opening credits following Jeffrey Fairbrother's departure and the arrival of Clive Dempster, also becoming a star-making role for Su Pollard.
Fred Quilley (Felix Bowness) Riding Instructor – Fred was an illegitimate child and grew up in an orphanage until he was adopted at the age of fourteen and went to live in Brighton. He began working at the Brighton Racecourse and eventually qualified as a jockey. He became involved with the daughter of the local undertaker but they split up when he refused to join the family business. During World War II he was conscripted into the RAF, where he trained as an instrument mechanic, but spent the entire war stationed at Catterick. After being demobilised in 1945, he returned to Brighton Racecourse and married the owner of a wet-fish shop, but the relationship was short-lived and they soon separated. He then fell into the employ of a small-time gangster known as "Big Mac", who began paying him to fix the races, either by pulling his horse or drugging it prior to the race. However, on one occasion the race officials caught him pulling the favourite and gave him an official warning. The following week he took £300 from Big Mac to lose a race but accidentally won, causing Big Mac to lose £5,000 in bets. Shortly afterwards Fred was caught in a horsebox with a syringe and his jockey's licence was revoked. He was forced to leave Brighton for fear of further reprisals from the underworld and began drifting, eventually joining the staff at Maplins in 1951 as the riding instructor. Fred shared a chalet with Mr Partridge, even though they both hated each other – Fred hated Partridge smelling of alcohol and Partridge hated Fred smelling of horses. When Partridge left and faked his death, Fred shared a chalet with Sammy, although they had a better relationship. After the end of the 1960 season, Fred went to work in an old horses' home.
Yvonne Stuart-Hargreaves (Diane Holland) Dancing Instructress – Yvonne was born in Southport in 1914, the daughter of a floorwalker at the Waring & Gillow Department Store. Yvonne was very supercilious and believed she was socially above all other members of the entertainment staff, with the exception of Jeffrey Fairbrother and Clive Dempster. She would often deride Maplins as a "dreadful, common place", seemingly only working there due to a lack of alternatives. It is assumed that she behaved in this way to hide a somewhat promiscuous youth. Because of her snobbish personality, she was disliked by many of her colleagues, Ted in particular. She met Barry when they were staying in digs together in Sunderland, but after a brief affair she became involved with a Hungarian acrobat from the Magyar Trio and became pregnant. When he found out he left her and joined ENSA. She then returned to Barry and he agreed to marry her, taking her home to be looked after by his family. It is not known what happened to the child. Barry and Yvonne later became professional ballroom dancers. During World War II Yvonne worked as an auxiliary nurse in a military hospital, and it was during this time that she met Julian Dalrymple-Sykes, and there is a suggestion that they had an affair. In 1942 Yvonne and Barry became ballroom champions, winning many trophies for their performances, although Ted believed they became champions only because of the reduced ranks of the opposition owing to most of the men being away fighting. Yvonne's and Barry's careers took a downturn after the war and in 1956 they were forced to join Maplins as dancing instructors. She always tried to keep her dignity and high-class values while at Maplins, but this was not made easy when she was forced to participate in the entertainment events. Yvonne disliked most of the entertainment staff, Ted Bovis and Mr Partridge in particular. She referred to Ted's money-making schemes as "petty", although she and Barry ran their own scheme selling cheap dancing shoes to campers for high prices. She was left heartbroken after Barry abandoned her for unknown reasons during the 1960 season, but she quickly recovered when Julian Dalrymple-Sykes arrived to replace Barry. She rekindled her relationship with Julian during the remainder of the season, but she never allowed him to become too close. After the end of the 1960 season they went travelling to dance in famous places across the world.
Barry Stuart-Hargreaves  (Series 1–7) (Barry Howard) Dancing Instructor – Barry was born Bert Pratt in Nottingham, the son of a bus inspector. By the late 1930s he was living in Sunderland where he met Yvonne and they began a brief affair, but she left him for another man. She later returned to him when she was pregnant, and he proposed. He took Yvonne's last name, and changed his first name to Barry, for the sake of their careers. During World War II he was conscripted into the Royal Navy and served as a stoker, though it is presumed he did not do this for long as he and Yvonne became ballroom champions in 1942. After the war, he and Yvonne continued dancing, but their careers were drawing to an end, and in 1956 they joined Maplins as a last resort. He was often heavily criticised by Yvonne for his etiquette, a habit which annoyed him intensely. Although his official jobs were to teach dance and give ballroom demonstrations, Barry was regularly chosen against his will to be the victim of the campers in the entertainment events, such as getting covered in water while dressed as a granny, having spaghetti stuffed down his trousers, and dressing up as "Percy the Pixie" to entertain the children. Barry suffered from a bad back, and on one occasion during the 1959 season he was left unable to move after straining it. Yvonne called in Julian Dalrymple-Sykes to take his place in the ballroom until he recovered, though it was made clear that Barry already knew about Julian and his history with Yvonne. Barry left Yvonne and departed Maplins midway through the 1960 season, and it is unknown why he left or where he went. Throughout the series, several hints were made that Barry was actually gay (such as when Ted references his ineligibility for the armed forces), although this was never confirmed.
William Partridge (Series 1–7) (Leslie Dwyer) Children's Entertainer – At the age of 74, Mr Partridge was the eldest member of the entertainment staff and the only one to be called by his honorific and surname out of respect for Victorian values. Mr Partridge was born in 1885. After leaving school he began a successful music hall career under the stage name of "Whimsical Willie, the Juggling Joker". at the height of his career he topped the bill at the Holborn Empire and performed for King George V in the Royal Command Performance at Windsor Castle. In 1914 he joined the British Army and fought on the Western Front until 1916, when he was badly wounded. He was shipped home to England but found that, due to the nature of his injuries, he was unable to return to his music hall career. Initially he tried a brief period as a comic, travelling the American circuit in New Orleans. He subsequently returned to England and started a children's entertainment business, performing Punch and Judy shows and magic tricks as Willie the Wizard. The business was a success and Mr Partridge found himself highly in demand performing for wealthy and respectable families. In 1939, at the outbreak of World War II, Mr Partridge left his business and joined ENSA, performing as a comic entertaining the troops in North Africa and France. After demobilisation in 1945, Mr Partridge found the demand for his services had dwindled and he was forced to take a job as children's entertainer at the Crimpton-on-Sea Maplins Holiday Camp. As the years wore on, Mr Partridge became dispirited by the lack of respect he received from the increasingly bad-mannered children who stayed at the camp. By the early 1950s he was drinking heavily and slipping into seasonal alcoholic benders, and regularly taking it upon himself to discipline the unruly children in a harsh and often violent manner. He is often asked why he is a children's entertainer if he dislikes children so much, a question which remains unanswered. At one point he tried to strangle a boy who was spoiling one of his shows, and it was left up to Ted to save Partridge's job. Mr Partridge also shows on numerous occasions a deep disdain for organised religion, frequently citing it as being responsible for all the trouble in the world.  Yet at the same time, he quotes from the Bible "thou shalt not make a graven image" when it suits him and even encourages Ted to set up religious services when the local vicar leaves the camp and he can see a money-making opportunity. During the 1960 season, he became involved with a pub landlady, faked his own death and left the camp to live with her in Cornwall.
Sylvia Garnsey  (Nikki Kelly) – Sylvia was born in 1931 in Littlehampton, and by 1959 she was the second-longest-serving Yellowcoat at the camp. Known for her long legs and attractive appearance, she regularly clashed with Gladys over Jeffrey Fairbrother. Sylvia was a qualified swimming instructor, and enjoyed flirting with both Jeffrey Fairbrother and Clive Dempster. Out of all the female Yellowcoats, Gladys disliked Sylvia the most. She won the most popular girl Yellowcoat competition during the 1959 season, the winner of which would be given the chance to work at a new Maplin camp in the Bahamas. She believed she had beaten Gladys for the first time in five years – she did not know that the vote was in fact tied, and Jeffrey gave the win to Sylvia so Gladys could stay with him at the camp. However, Sylvia lost the job at the new Bahamas camp when it was destroyed in a storm shortly after her victory. The tension between her and Gladys lasted throughout both seasons, although it mellowed slightly towards the end of the 1960 season – Gladys suggested Sylvia should replace her as chief Yellowcoat when she moved to Australia. This did not materialise, however, following the modernisation of Maplins and the abolition of Yellowcoats after the 1960 season.
Squadron Leader, the Honourable Clive Dempster DFC (David Griffin) (Series 6–9) Entertainment Manager – The aristocratic war hero replaced Jeffrey Fairbrother as Entertainment Manager at the start of the 1960 season. He was the complete opposite to Jeffrey – a maverick ladies' man who enjoyed cheating the campers and the staff. He was reckless with the money his family occasionally sent him, drank cocktails rather than beer, provided champagne at staff meetings and drove a red MG TC convertible. Clive was born in 1924, the only son of William, Lord Dempster, and Lady Dempster (née Helen Mary Waverston). He grew up in Cambridgeshire at the family estate of Dempster Hall, where his father's unmarried siblings also resided. During the Second World War he served in the RAF with the rank of Squadron Leader, led numerous night-time raids over Germany, and was awarded the Distinguished Flying Cross (DFC). He found life difficult upon demobilisation and spent several years drifting. He briefly became manager of a country club but was robbed by his business partner and left with a large debt to pay. He then joined Maplins as entertainment manager, and ran the camp in a far more laid-back way than his predecessor, Jeffrey Fairbrother. Unlike Fairbrother, Clive got involved with Ted's money-making schemes, the most memorable being when they drugged several campers in order to search their chalets for a stolen necklace. It was revealed that Joe Maplin gave Clive the job because he desired a knighthood, and he believed Clive's connection to the aristocracy could help him acquire this. Clive began a relationship with Gladys shortly after arriving at Maplins, and eventually married her (against his family's wishes) at the end of the 1960 season. They emigrated to Australia, where he had been offered a job flying commercial aircraft by his former RAF Wing Commander.
Joan Wainwright (Cheryl Murray) (Series 4) Controller of Yellowcoats – Joan Wainwright was one of Joe Maplin's lovers. She was sports organiser at the Camber Sands camp during the 1958 season, and moved into Joe Maplin's house in Hampstead after beginning an affair with him. He promoted her and sent her to the Crimpton-on-Sea camp to act as an overall controller of Yellowcoats during the 1959 season. She was an arrogant and selfish woman who used her association with Joe Maplin to gain promotion and authority. She immediately clashed with Gladys, whom she believed was bad at her job because of her lack of sports qualifications. She took away Gladys's authority and made Tracey Bentwood chief Yellowcoat and sports organiser, causing Gladys to resign. Gladys was saved by Ted, who knew Wainwright from years before when they performed together at "The Palace" at Attercliffe. Her real name was Beryl Green, and she was assistant to a magician called "The Great Ming" whom she became pregnant by. Ted threatened to reveal her past to Joe Maplin unless she resigned and left the camp.
Julian Dalrymple-Sykes (Ben Aris) (Series 5, Series 8–9) Dancing Instructor – Julian was a former lover of Yvonne's who stood in for Barry when he was incapacitated with a bad back during the 1959 season. He then joined Yvonne full-time at the camp following Barry's departure midway through the 1960 season. Julian was a pig farmer by profession and had a very successful business, which he left in the care of his assistant Mr Turner (Billy Burden) when he went to work at Maplins. He was also a championship boxer having been ABA welterweight champion four years running in the 1940s, and challenged Ted to a fight after an argument in one episode. After joining Maplins full-time, he briefly shared Ted and Spike's chalet before being given one of his own, and annoyed Ted with his habit of getting up early to go for a morning swim. Throughout the series he desperately tried to rekindle his past romance with Yvonne, but she frequently played hard-to-get, which frustrated him enormously. He tried to persuade Yvonne to leave Maplins and live with him at his pig farm, but she refused, claiming that she "couldn't stand the mud". After the 1960 season, he sold his farm and took Yvonne travelling around the world.
Harold Fox (Gavin Richards) (Series 5–7) General Manager – Fox was the general manager of all the Maplins holiday camps, usually referred to as "The Smiling Viper", "Joe Maplin's Hatchet-man" or, in Yvonne's words, "A nasty, common, jumped-up, slimey, little toad". He owned a Jaguar which was chauffeur-driven and he was feared by most of the staff. He believed his power would win him favour with the opposite sex, but in truth most women despised him. He visited the camp on several occasions representing Joe Maplin. On one occasion, Peggy asked him permission to become a Yellowcoat, although he turned her down. Ted visited Fox at Head Office in London at the start of the 1960 season, believing he was going to be given the job as entertainment manager following Jeffrey Fairbrother's departure. In truth, Fox had simply called Ted in to give him an outstanding tax bill, and to inform him that Clive Dempster had been given the entertainment manager's job. During one of his visits to Crimpton-on-Sea, he took Gladys out to dinner at Tony's Trattoria, but she pretended to be ill and left halfway through so she could go on a date with Clive.
Uncle Sammy Morris (Series 7, Series 8–9) (Kenneth Connor) Children's Entertainer – Uncle Sammy was an independent children's entertainer who had fallen on hard times and was noticed by Ted and Spike on the beach at Grapethorpe. During World War II Sammy had served in the army under Clive's uncle, General Dempster, and had crossed the Rhine in 1945. He was then based in Vienna and had helped Joe Maplin to flee the country when he was on the run from the police, resulting in Maplin owing him a favour. Ted brought Sammy to the camp to replace Mr Partridge, but soon after he absconded with a sack of Joe Maplin's trophies and was subsequently arrested. Sammy used his knowledge of Joe Maplin's shady past to blackmail him into dropping the charges and giving him a full-time job at the camp, but spent his first weeks sleeping in a hedge and eating rubbish from the dustbins. Sammy eventually settled into his job, and entertained the children dressed as a schoolmaster, rather than performing Punch and Judy shows. He once again used his leverage over Joe Maplin to get rid of Alec Foster, the camp controller. Sammy later took a shine to a woman who worked in the Happy Halibut Fish Bar, and finally had a bath, a shave, a haircut and new clothes. After the 1960 season ended, Sammy revealed he had acquired a job over the winter working as a Father Christmas at Whiteleys. It is unknown what Sammy intended to do after this, but he stated in the final episode that his job at Maplins and his friendship with Fred Quilley had changed his life forever.
Alec Foster (Ewan Hooper) (Series 8, Series 9) Camp Controller – Foster was appointed by Joe Maplin to take charge of the camp midway through the 1960 season. Foster had served as a Sergeant in the RAF during the war, and became disliked by the entertainments staff. Foster invited Peggy to grant him sexual favours, in return for which he would make her a Yellowcoat. When Gladys confronted Foster about this, he propositioned her in the same way, causing Spike to come to her rescue. When Spike challenged him, Foster punched him in the face, giving him a black eye. During his time at the camp, Foster was cruel and rude to every member of the staff, and sacked Peggy and Clive. He was recalled to head office and his decisions were reversed by Joe Maplin, after Sammy Morris called in a favour which Maplin owed him. He returned later in the season to inspect the staff, and sacked Ted after he asked for a pay rise. Foster then hired Jimmy Jasper as the new camp host, but was forced to reinstate Ted because Jasper's act was a disaster with the campers. Foster returned once again in the final episode to break the news to the staff that their services would not be required the following season, and presented them with a copy of Joe Maplin's autobiography, titled How I Done It.
Marty Storm (Series 1) (Richard Cottan) Elvis Presley Impersonator – His real name is Wilf Green. He was liked by the girls especially Mary. He only appeared in the pilot and in the first episode of the first series. His departure is not explained in the show, but according to the book 30 Years of 'Allo 'Allo!: The Inside Story of the Hit TV Show, Marty Storm secured a recording contract and left the camp.
Stanley Mathews (David Webb) – Identical twin brother of Bruce Mathews, a minor character until series four when he became a character involved with story lines. He was ordered by Harold Fox to change his appearance or he or his brother would be fired.
Bruce Mathews (Tony Webb) – Identical twin brother of Stanley Mathews. Like Stanley he is a minor character until series four. They both completed their national service together.
Gary Bolton (Terence Creasy/Chris Andrews) – Gary is the third male Yellowcoat. He is often portrayed as a very vain man, obsessed with women and his appearance. He had a personal crisis during the 1960 season four when he couldn't take part in the assault course race against the Marines because he was receiving treatment for hair loss. Like the twins he is a minor character until series four when he along with the twins receive their first photo credit.
Betty Whistler (Series 1–5) (Rikki Howard) – Betty was born in 1938 in Harrow-on-the-Hill, and worked at Maplins as a Yellowcoat during the 1958 and 1959 seasons. She previously attended drama school and was a qualified swimming instructor. She also had a dislike for Gladys, whom she saw as bossy and overbearing. She did not return to Maplins for the 1960 season.
Mary (Series 1) (Penny Irving) – A petite red-haired Scottish Yellowcoat who worked at the camp for only a couple of months at the start of the 1959 season, though a comment in the pilot indicates she worked there for the 1958 season too. It is unknown why she left.
Val (Series 2) (Gail Harrison) – The pretty, frizzy-haired Yellowcoat who replaced Mary for a couple of months during the 1959 season. She, too, left for unknown reasons.
Tracey Bentwood (Series 3–5) (Susan Beagley) – The attractive brunette who replaced Val for the remainder of the 1959 season. A doctor's daughter, born in Stoke Newington in 1935, Tracey was a former club champion in tennis and was also a league basketball player. She clashed with Gladys several times, most notably when she was temporarily made chief Yellowcoat and sports organiser by Joan Wainwright. She did not return for the 1960 season.
Hilda (Series 1) (Marianne Tollast) – A young woman with black hair and glasses. Plays the electric organ beside "the Olympic sized swimming pool" in the Pilot Episode but is replaced by Ramona in later episodes. Her departure is not explained and she has an extremely minor presence.
April Wingate (Series 6–9) (Linda Regan) – April worked as a hairdresser before joining Maplins in 1960. She is portrayed as a rather childish character, such as wanting to see Bambi at the cinema for her birthday. During her time at Maplins she began a relationship with Spike, and eventually decided she would like to marry him and live in a bungalow. Spike also wanted to get married, but did not want to give up being a comic in favour of a steady job, which upset April. She broke up their relationship after Joe Maplin leaked a story that Spike and Gladys were having an affair, but they got back together when this was proved false. Gladys often reprimands April for "mooning after Spike" rather than spending time with the campers. She and Spike were still together at the end of the 1960 season (although before that, they briefly split up) and it is unknown where they went next.
Dawn Freshwater (Series 6–9) (Laura Jackson) – Dawn was born in Watford. She often clashed with Gladys over her habit of pouting rather than smiling. She grew close to Clive Dempster during the 1960 season, albeit without Gladys' knowledge. She had an affair with Gary. With two weeks of the season remaining she was admitted to hospital with appendicitis, allowing Peggy to replace her as a Yellowcoat for the last fortnight. The entertainment staff visited her in hospital (as well as Peggy, who had collapsed from nervous exhaustion at the excitement of becoming a Yellowcoat). It is unknown what Dawn intended to do after the 1960 season.
Babs Weaver (Series 6–7) (Julie-Christian Young) – Babs had come second in the Holiday Princess Competition at the Camber Sands camp in 1959, and got a job as a Yellowcoat at the Crimpton-on-Sea camp for the 1960 season. She left midway through the season without explanation.
Charlie Dawson (Series 5) (Johnny Allan) – A local hardman who owned a butcher's shop in Crimpton-on-Sea, and was also the chairman of the local Chamber of Commerce. He hated Joe Maplin and fought to stop him building the holiday camp in Crimpton in the first place. He employed Ted Bovis to perform as a comedian at the Chamber of Commerce annual dinner. At the dinner, Dawson conspired with other members to blackmail Joe Maplin into giving him the rights to run all the shops at the camp, or they would stop him building a new extension. Peggy, who was working as a waitress at the dinner, overheard this plan and informed Ted. Ted planned to betray Joe Maplin and attempted to blackmail Dawson into cutting him in on the deal, but Dawson refused. Peggy secretly phoned Joe Maplin and alerted him to Dawson's plan, allowing Maplin the chance to blackmail Dawson into backing off. Dawson's plan subsequently failed, and Peggy was rewarded for her loyalty.
Tony (Series 7) (Graham Stark) – The owner of Tony's Trattoria, the local Italian restaurant in Crimpton-on-Sea. He had a reputation for serving bad food, giving both Jeffrey Fairbrother and Tracey Bentwood food poisoning. Gladys' birthday party (along with her dates with Peggy, Clive and Fox) was held in his restaurant during the 1960 season. When deciding what to do for April's birthday later in the season, Tony's Trattoria was suggested as a venue, but this never went ahead as Clive revealed the restaurant had been closed down by the Health Authority.
Mrs Baxter (Lally Bowers) – The old lady who rented a cottage on Joe Maplin's land next to the camp. Maplin wanted her to move out of the cottage so he could demolish it in order to build more chalets. He offered her a new modern bungalow and £300 to persuade her to move (Ted tried to steal £250 of it), but she refused. Maplin then planned to demolish the cottage while Mrs Baxter was out shopping, but the plan was thwarted by the entertainment staff.
Mr Turner (Series 8–9) (Billy Burden) – Julian Dalrymple-Sykes' assistant who helped him at his pig farm. When Julian joined Maplins full-time, Mr Turner was left in charge of running the farm. Burden also appeared in the first episode of series 7, playing a different character that of a disgruntled camper.
Ramona (Jean Lear) – The camp organist, who was usually seen playing the organ at the side of the pool.
Jimmy Jasper (Series 9) (Brian Godfrey) – The comedian who briefly replaced Ted as Camp Host after he was fired by Alec Foster during the 1960 season. He only spent one night in the job, as his act proved to be a disaster with the campers, and Foster was forced to reinstate Ted.
Henry (Gordon Peters) – The gate keeper. He had a lot of trouble when Clive's family visited the camp, causing chaos when their car (and a lorry delivering toilet rolls) broke down in the gateway. In an earlier episode the gatekeeper was played by Rex Lear.
Plumber (Series 6) (Ronnie Brody) – The plumber at Maplins, twice seen cleaning Fred and Mr Partridge's sink.
Percy (Series 9) (Paddy Ward) – The maintenance man and handyman.
Bert Swanley and the Debonaires – The resident band at Maplins, who are often seen in the background in the ballroom.
Fred Larkin – The camp cook, who was referred to as Cordon Blue, and whose dubious meals are often the cause of illness at the camp.
Bert Green – Replaced Fred Larkin as camp cook.
Rupert the Pudding Chef – A close friend of Peggy's.
Charles Dempster (Dennis Ramsden) – Clive's uncle. He visited Clive at Maplins to try to persuade him to return to Dempster Hall and help his father run it. Although Clive refused, he recommended Gladys for the job. It is revealed that Clive got on better with Charles than he did with his father. Charles disapproved of Clive's relationship with Gladys due to her being from a working-class background. When informed that Clive intended to marry Gladys in secret, against his family's wishes, he and his other siblings drove to Essex and attempted to stop the wedding, but they were thwarted by Ted, who had changed all the road signs around.
Winifred Dempster (Mavis Pugh) – Clive's aunt. Out of all the Dempster siblings, Winifred disapproved the strongest over Clive's relationship with Gladys. She visited Maplins only once, when all the siblings turned up to surprise Clive. Winifred learned of Clive's intention to marry Gladys in secret after being tipped off by Yvonne Stuart-Hargreaves, and she attempted to stop the wedding, along with the other siblings.
General Sir Claude Dempster (Peter Fontaine) – Clive's uncle. He commanded in the army during the Second World War, and crossed the Rhine in 1945. It is revealed that Sammy Morris served under his command at this time. He visited Maplins with his other siblings and tried to stop Clive's wedding to Gladys.
Admiral Neville Dempster (Iain Anders) – Clive's uncle.
Bishop Simon Dempster (Fred Bryant) – Clive's uncle.

Not seen
Joe Maplin (Camp Owner) – The greedy and philandering owner of the six Maplins holiday camps. It was intended that he would be played by Bob Monkhouse, but he was unavailable for filming. Joe Maplin communicated with the entertainments staff through sarcastic, hectoring, semi-literate letters which Jeffrey Fairbrother would have to read to the staff.  It was implied that sections of these letters contained coarse and vulgar language by the fact that Jeffrey Fairbrother would often skip sections of them under the pretence he was attempting to come to the point more quickly stating something like "Mr Maplin doesn't mince his words" to explain the omissions.  Throughout the series it is revealed that Maplin owns a large string of camps all over the country. As well as the sitcom's Crimpton-on-Sea camp, Maplin also owned camps at locations such as Camber Sands, and the Isle of Wight. Maplin claimed to be the person who invented the catchphrase "Hi-de-Hi!", although according to Mr Partridge, it was not Maplin's idea, but that of a mad colonel in the army during the Second World War. Maplin had a habit of covertly inspecting the staff at his camps by disguising himself as a camper, leaving his chauffeur-driven Rolls-Royce several streets away and entering the camp in a taxi. Although Joe Maplin is never seen in the flesh a bronze statue of him appears in the series 5 episode The Graven Image. The statue shows Mr Maplin as a slightly portly middle aged man in a business suit although it is hard to discern his features in any great detail as the statue only appears in long shots or part close ups. For much of the episode the statue is painted to look like a clown by a drunken Spike in a fit of pique at being asked to make a fawning speech about him. This results in numerous attempts to paint the statue back to bronze that are continuously ruined by the weather. Jeffrey Fairbrother describes Mr Maplin as a "megalomaniac" while Ted explains to Spike that people aren't interested in the "truth" of Joe Maplin that he is a "crook" but in the legend Joe Maplin has created about himself as a self-made man from humble origins because this is a better story.
Miss Cathcart – Peggy's supervisor and nemesis.

Themes

Several underlying themes were apparent throughout the show's run. For the characters, working at the camp was either a step up or step down the ladder of success in show business. The younger staff (e.g. Spike Dixon and the Yellowcoats) were keen and enthusiastic about their jobs, which they saw as a lucky break at the start of their careers. For the older members of the staff (e.g. Yvonne, Barry and Mr Partridge), the camp was a step down from past glories. Caught in the middle were staff members close to middle age (e.g. Ted Bovis and Fred Quilley) who still believed they could achieve fame and fortune, and were reluctant to accept that working at a holiday camp was the best they would ever do.

The changing nature of British society was reflected in the series. The erosion of class boundaries that occurred in the post-war years, and attitudes to these changes, was illustrated in the character mix. Jeffrey Fairbrother's determination to leave a promising career in academia for something "real" was met with horror by his upper-class family and incomprehension by the Dean of his college, who visited the camp to persuade him to return to Cambridge. Yvonne and Barry Stuart-Hargreaves looked down on almost everyone at the camp, save for Fairbrother – although they were disappointed in his insistence that they take part in "vulgar" games as part of the entertainment, believing he should stand up for people of "his own class". Conversely, the societal changes were welcomed by other staff, particularly Ted and Spike, who believed that Peggy's attempts at becoming a Yellowcoat were thwarted by prejudice against her working-class background, as the current Yellowcoats were middle-class and well-spoken.

The series was set at a time of change in the fashion of the so-called traditional British holiday. During the years after the Second World War, British holiday camps flourished, as people were celebrating with fun and laughter again after years of austerity and wartime hardship. The series was set towards the end of this period, when the original format of holiday camps was coming to an end. Despite the feeling amongst many staff that their brand of fun and entertainment for the whole family was a tradition that would endure, the emerging trend at the time (late 1950s / early 1960s) for self-catering and holidaying abroad meant the camp was unlikely to survive in its original format. The closing storyline of the series was the camp undergoing drastic changes to modernise with the times, meaning that many of the staff would lose their jobs as their particular talents were no longer required.

Episodes

The pilot episode was broadcast on 1 January 1980. Hi-de-Hi! ran for nine series totalling 60 episodes, between 26 February 1981 and 30 January 1988. Because of the programme's success, the BBC decided to air series 3 and 4 back-to-back, the only time the BBC has ever done this with one of their own (first run) shows, which means that some sources refer to both series as series 3.

The stage show
Hi-de-Hi was made into a musical, called Hi-de-Hi – The Holiday Musical, in the early years of the show. Labelled as a "summer pantomime" by its critics, the production featured most of the TV cast plus several new characters. It did not follow the television storylines, but it was a success nonetheless. It did a summer season in Bournemouth in 1983, a Christmas season in London in 1983 and a summer season in Blackpool in 1984. It was short-lived, however, when some of the cast complained that filming the TV series and doing the summer show limited their offers of acting jobs elsewhere.

At the height of its audience ratings, the BBC had plans to make it into a feature film, but this did not come to fruition.

In August 2009, a Hi-de-Hi! stage show toured in Torquay.

In March 2010 the show was revived for a six-month national tour produced by Bruce James Productions Limited and written by Paul Carpenter and Ian Gower, adapting scenes and storylines from episodes of the television series including A Night Not To Remember and Maplin Intercontinental. The audience were treated as campers during scenes involving camp entertainment which included musical numbers and audience participation. The production starred two members of the original cast, Barry Howard, reprising his role of Barry Stuart-Hargreaves, and Nikki Kelly, originally Sylvia, taking the role of Yvonne Stuart-Hargreaves. The tour also starred Peter Amory as Jeffrey Fairbrother, Abigail Finley as Peggy Ollerenshaw, Rebecca Bainbridge as Gladys Pugh, Damian Williams as Ted Bovis, Ben Roddy as Spike Dixon, Richard Colson as William Partridge, Andrew Fettes as Fred Quilley, Kate Burrell as Sylvia Garnsey, Lauren Harrison as Betty Whistler and Carrie Laurence as Tracey Bentwood. Several performances of the tour had to be cancelled due to low ticket sales despite positive reviews.

Following the end of the tour an amended version of the script was made available for amateur performances, the script lacks many of the camp entertainment scenes including the musical numbers whilst adding a subplot featuring Ted's ex-wife from the episode Trouble and Strife. The original tour set and costumes are available for hire from Bruce Jones Productions Limited.

Amateur productions include those by the Teignmouth Players Amateur Dramatic Society at the Carlton Theatre, Teignmouth, The Western College Players at the Drum Theatre, Plymouth, (both in July 2011), and The Halifax Thespians at the Halifax Playhouse in March 2012. In May 2019, the Brookside Theatre, Romford staged a production. It was staged by The Crowborough Players in May 2013.

A stage play for amateur production by Paul Carpenter and Ian Gower is available from Samuel French Ltd of London.

Theme music and merchandise
Hi-de-Hi! had a rock and roll style theme tune called "Holiday Rock". Sung by Ken Barrie, who would later provide the voice of Postman Pat, on the series opening titles, the song was later released as a single with the main vocal part sung by Paul Shane and the Yellowcoats (it featured several members of the cast on backing vocals). It became a UK Top 40 hit in May 1981 and Shane and members of the cast performed the song on Cheggers Plays Pop on 1 June 1981: cutt.ly/4JuBf3i

Hi-de-Hi! was one of the first BBC shows to capitalise on the merchandise market, with products such as board games, albums, books, toys and T-shirts available to buy.

Production

Filming
The location scenes of Hi-de-Hi! were filmed at a real holiday camp run by Warners in the town of Dovercourt near Harwich, Essex. This closed in 1990 and was later replaced by the Hightrees housing estate.

The pilot episode (1979) and first two series (1980–1981) were all filmed during early spring before the holiday camp was opened to the public for the summer. This is noticeable during outdoor scenes, because most of the trees on the camp site are bare. Since it was so cold during filming a lot of the outdoor scenes, the cast were continuously complaining about having to appear in summer clothing, and Jeffrey Holland was treated for hypothermia during the first series because his character spent much of the time in the swimming pool.

In keeping with other BBC comedy series, such as Perry and Croft's previous hit Dad's Army, as well as Steptoe and Son, Whatever Happened to the Likely Lads? and several others, in 1982 a series of BBC Radio adaptations of episodes was unofficially agreed. However, due to the changing demographics of BBC Radio output in the early-mid 1980s, the plan was dropped.

After Hi-de-Hi!

Several principal cast members were reunited in another period piece by the same writers called You Rang, M'Lord?, which piloted in 1988, and ran for four series to 1993, and again in Oh, Doctor Beeching! by David Croft and Richard Spendlove from 1995 for two series.

Home releases
Series One and Series Two, including the pilot, were released in a boxed set by Universal Playback on 3 March 2003, followed by a boxed set of Series Three and Series Four on 5 April 2004. The Series 5 and Series 6 was released in a boxed set on 23 October 2006. Universal Playback encountered problems when releasing the first four series on DVD because they did not hold the rights to the soundtrack. As a result, some of the episodes were edited. Series Seven was released on 5 May 2008. Series Eight and Series Nine were released in a double pack on 22 September 2008. A complete boxed set containing all 9 series has also been released.

References

Bibliography
Mark Lewisohn, "Radio Times Guide to TV Comedy", BBC Worldwide Ltd, 2003
British TV Comedy Guide for Hi-de-Hi!

External links

Hi-de-Hi! at British Comedy and Drama
The officially recognised website for fans of Hi-de-Hi! and You Rang, M'Lord? (archived via Wayback Machine

1980s British sitcoms
1980 British television series debuts
1988 British television series endings
1980s British workplace comedy television series
BBC television sitcoms
David Croft sitcoms
English-language television shows
Television series created by Jimmy Perry
Television series set in 1959
Television series set in 1960
Television shows set in Essex